Vladislav Mikhailovich Kulik (born 27 February 1985) is a Russian former footballer who played as a central midfielder. Born and raised in Poltava, Ukraine, he decided to represent Russia on international level.

Club career
On 2 July 2019, he signed a 1-year contract with Russian Premier League club FC Tambov. On 20 January 2020, he signed with Russian Football National League club FC Chayka Peschanokopskoye, where he reunited with Magomed Adiyev, who coached him at Anzhi several months earlier.

Career statistics

References

External links
  Player page on the official FC Terek Grozny website
 

1985 births
Living people
Sportspeople from Poltava
Russian footballers
Association football midfielders
FC Lada-Tolyatti players
FC Rotor Volgograd players
FC Chernomorets Novorossiysk players
FC Ural Yekaterinburg players
FC Akhmat Grozny players
PFC Krylia Sovetov Samara players
FC Kuban Krasnodar players
FC Rubin Kazan players
FC Orenburg players
FC Anzhi Makhachkala players
FC Tambov players
Russian Premier League players
Russia national football B team footballers
FC Chayka Peschanokopskoye players